Antonio Busca may refer to:
Antonio Busca (painter) (1625–1686), Italian painter
Antonio Busca (lieutenant) (1767–1834), Italian nobleman, descendant of the above